The Hickman Mill Historic District encompasses an early 20th-century textile mill complex in Graniteville, South Carolina.  It is located just south of the older Graniteville Mill, and is bounded on the north by Marshall Street, the east by Canal Street, and the south by Hard Street.  The complex includes a large brick mill building, and the Classical Revival Hickman Memorial Hall.  The mill was built by Tracy Hickman, whose father had succeeded William Gregg at the helm of the Graniteville Mill.  The hall was built in 1908 as a place to provide recreational and cultural opportunities to the mill workers.

The district was listed on the National Register of Historic Places in 2016.

See also
National Register of Historic Places listings in Aiken County, South Carolina

References

Historic districts in Aiken County, South Carolina
National Register of Historic Places in Aiken County, South Carolina
Historic districts on the National Register of Historic Places in South Carolina